Psoroglaena is a genus of lichen-forming fungi in the family Verrucariaceae. The genus was circumscribed by Johann Müller Argoviensis in 1891, with Psoroglaena cubensis assigned as the type species.

Species
Psoroglaena abscondita 
Psoroglaena arachnoidea  – Mexico
Psoroglaena biatorella 
Psoroglaena chirisanensis  – South Korea
Psoroglaena coreana  – South Korea
Psoroglaena cubensis 
Psoroglaena dictyospora 
Psoroglaena epiphylla  – Costa Rica
Psoroglaena gangwondoensis 
Psoroglaena halmaturina  – Australia
Psoroglaena hepaticicola 
Psoroglaena humidosilvae  – South Korea
Psoroglaena japonica  – Japan
Psoroglaena laevigata  – Costa Rica
Psoroglaena ornata  – Mexico
Psoroglaena perminuta 
Psoroglaena sorediata  – Mexico
Psoroglaena spinosa  – Sri Lanka
Psoroglaena stigonemoides 
Psoroglaena sunchonensis  – South Korea

References

Verrucariales
Eurotiomycetes genera
Lichen genera
Taxa described in 1891
Taxa named by Johannes Müller Argoviensis